Louis-Nicolas Darbon was born 1983 in Paris and is a French London-based contemporary artist influenced by pop art, neo-expressionism and street art. He is well known for his various iconic pop figure portraits and fashion inspired artworks. He is also popular on social media for his dress sense.

Life and career 
Louis-Nicolas Darbon was born and grew up in Versailles and Paris in France. He studied at a private university and lived in New York, Beijing, Shanghai, Hong Kong and Tokyo during his studies. After graduating he returned to Europe and worked for fashion houses including Marc Jacobs, Louis Vuitton, Net-a-Porter, Christian Louboutin and Burberry.

Since 2013 Louis-Nicolas has been represented by galleries worldwide. He has exhibited both nationally and internationally. He took part in Art Basel Hong Kong 2016 and has had solo shows and group shows in London, New York, Hong Kong, Japan, Marrakesh, France and Switzerland.

References 
The Renaissance Man, 07.07.2016, Ragazzo Magazine

'LOUIS-NICOLAS DARBON SMUDGES THE LINE BETWEEN ART AND FASHION', September 2015, Country & Townhouse

'Meet The Collectors', 25.10.2015, The Times

Louis-Nicolas Darbon, May Issue 2015 p. 130, Harrods Magazine

'EXPOSURE', July 2014, Wall Street International

Exposure at Imitate Modern, 22.07.2014, The Upcoming

Style Sketches by Louis-Nicolas Darbon, 25.07.2014, MNSWR Magazine

External links 
 Official website of Louis-Nicolas Darbon

Living people
1983 births
French contemporary artists